Muhammad Yaseen is a Canadian politician who was elected in the 2019 Alberta general election to represent the northwest Calgary electoral district of Calgary-North in the 30th Alberta Legislature. He was appointed Parliamentary Secretary for Community Outreach on October 24, 2022. Previously, he was appointed Associate Minister of Immigration and Multiculturalism on July 8, 2021. Prior to this, Yaseen was appointed Parliamentary Secretary of Immigration on April 30, 2019. He has served as a member of the Standing Committees on Resource Stewardship, Legislative Offices and the Alberta Heritage Savings Trust Fund. Additionally, he is co-chair of the Caucus Outreach Committee.

Prior to serving with the Legislative Assembly, Yaseen worked his entire professional career in the oil industry. He began his career in 1979 in Rimbey, Alberta and retired after 40 years of service with Imperial Oil, which is majority-owned by ExxonMobil. An engineer by profession, he is experienced in reservoir/joint ventures engineering, and has held various advisory roles in processing, transportation, contracts and projects.

He holds a bachelor of science degree in petroleum engineering from the University of Wyoming, a master's degree in civil engineering from the University of Calgary and a master's of business administration from the University of Phoenix. He is a professional engineer and is a member of APEGA, the Association of Professional Engineers and Geoscientists of Alberta.

Yaseen has been an active member of the Calgary community since the 1970's, volunteering with the Canadian Red Cross and the Pakistan Canada Association for many years. He has also contributed his time to Junior Achievement, the United Way, the Mustard Seed, MOSAIC Volunteers and the Calgary Food Bank.

Yaseen was awarded the Queen Elizabeth II Diamond Jubilee Medal in November 2012 by then Lieutenant Governor of Alberta, the Honourable Donald S. Ethell.

|}

References

United Conservative Party MLAs
Living people
Politicians from Calgary
Canadian politicians of Pakistani descent
21st-century Canadian politicians
Year of birth missing (living people)